The 1998 Cincinnati Open, known by the corporate title of the Great American Insurance ATP Championships was a tennis tournament played on outdoor hard courts. It was the 95th edition of the tournament previously known as the Thriftway ATP Championships, and was part of the ATP Super 9 of the 1998 ATP Tour.  It took place in Mason, United States, from August 10 through August 17, 1998.

The tournament had previously appeared on the Tier III of the WTA Tour but no event was held from 1989 to 2003.

Finals

Singles

 Patrick Rafter defeated  Pete Sampras, 1–6, 7–6(7–2), 6–4
It was Rafter's 4th title of the year and his 6th overall. It was his 2nd Masters title of the year and overall.

Doubles

 Mark Knowles /  Daniel Nestor defeated  Olivier Delaître /  Fabrice Santoro, 6–1, 2–1, ret.

References

External links
 
 ATP tournament profile

 
Cincinnati Masters
Cincinnati Masters
Great American Insurance ATP Championships
Great American Insurance ATP Championships
Great American Insurance ATP Championships